Šaljska Bistrica is a settlement in the Leposavić municipality in northern Kosovo.

Name
In 1986, the secondary name of Šaljska Bistrica was the Slavicised version "Bistrica e Shalës". The name is linked with the Albanian Shala tribe.

Geography
The village is located 12 km southeast from Leposavić, below the Kopaonik. The settlement lies on both sides of the middle flow of the Bistrica, a right tributary of Ibar. The settlement is of the scattered type (razbijenog tipa), and its cadastral area includes 787 hectares.

History
The toponym Crkvište is used for the area of the church ruins.

Demographics
The village is inhabited by an ethnic Albanian majority.

Notes

References

Sources

External links
http://kossev.info/strana/arhiva/veterani_ovk_grade_elektranu_u_opstini_leposavic/3609
http://www.info-ks.net/clanak/49714/tezak-zivot-mjestana-saljske-bistrica
http://www.novosti.rs/vesti/srbija.73.html:531446-Leposavic-Drenicani-mute-Bistricu

Villages in Leposavić